Mariano Rampolla del Tindaro (17 August 1843 – 16 December 1913) was an Italian Cardinal in the Roman Catholic Church, and the last man to have his candidacy for papal election vetoed through jus exclusivae by a Catholic monarch.

Rampolla is in the episcopal lineage of Pope Francis.

Early life
Born in Polizzi Generosa, Sicily, Rampolla was the son of Ignazio Rampolla, Count of Tindaro, and of his wife, Orsola Errante.

Rampolla entered the Vatican Seminary in 1856, and in 1861 continued his education at the Collegio Capranica and the Pontifical Gregorian University. Having displayed a considerable knowledge in Oriental affairs, he was sent to the Pontifical Academy of Ecclesiastical Nobles as preparation for service in the Roman Curia.

In 1866 Rampolla was ordained a priest. He obtained a doctorate in utroque iure (Canon Law and Civil Law) in 1870. In 1874 he was named a Canon of the Basilica di Santa Maria Maggiore. In 1875, he was sent to Spain as Auditor of the papal Nunciature. In 1877 he was named Secretary for Oriental Affairs of the Congregation for the Propagation of the Faith. The following year he was named a Protonotary apostolic de numero participantium, the highest rank of monsignor. In 1880 he was named Secretary of the Congregation for the Propagation of the Faith, the Vatican office which deals with areas of the world in which there is no regularly constituted hierarchy of bishops. Then Rampolla was also appointed Secretary of the Congregation of Extraordinary Ecclesiastical Affairs, the subsection of the Secretariat of State that deals with the foreign affairs of the Holy See.

This was in preparation for his nomination as Apostolic Nuncio to Spain, which came on 19 December 1882.

Cardinal

In the consistory of 14 March 1887, Pope Leo XIII created Rampolla del Tindaro a Cardinal-Priest, and on 26 May assigned him the titular church  of Santa Cecilia in Trastevere. On 2 June he was appointed Secretary of State. In this office, as he had previously in Spain, Rampolla employed Giacomo della Chiesa, the future Benedict XV, as his secretary.

On 21 March 1894, Pope Leo XIII named Cardinal Rampolla Archpriest of Saint Peter's Basilica.

As Secretary of State, Cardinal Rampolla supported the Austrian Christian Social Party, led by Karl Lueger, sometime mayor of Vienna (1897–1910). Lueger entered office over the disapproval of Emperor Franz Joseph through the personal intervention of Leo XIII. Lueger's Christian Social Party was the first Catholic social movement that was both anti-liberal and anti-Semitic. Rampolla began to swing papal policy from support of Austria toward support of France, Austria's enemy. In Italy, he opposed every government that came to office, on the grounds that there was nothing to lose, and perhaps something to gain, especially on the international scene. He fought for the restoration of the pope's control over the former Papal States and fought new penal codes that aimed to criminalize clerical activity. Rampolla expressed his opinion that the French public was obligated to support the French Prime Minister Jules Méline at the height of the Dreyfus Affair.

1903 Conclave

When Leo XIII died in 1903, it was widely expected that Rampolla would be elected pope. His candidacy gained momentum until the last moment when the Austrian Emperor Francis Joseph I imposed the veto jus exclusivae during the conclave. Cardinal Jan Puzyna de Kosielsko, Prince-Archbishop of Kraków, expressed the veto on behalf of the Austrian emperor. Rampolla was reported to have received enough votes to win.

The Secretary of the Conclave, Archbishop Rafael Merry del Val, reported later that Cardinal Puzyna de Kosielsko came to see him, demanding to announce his veto against Cardinal Rampolla in the name of Franz Joseph. Merry Del Val protested and refused even to accept the document. Rampolla, according to Merry del Val, actually gained votes after the veto. However, Merry del Val later told Ludwig von Pastor that he thought Rampolla was unlikely to win since a majority of the cardinals wanted a more conservative direction following the relatively liberal pontificate of Pope Leo XIII, as did he himself.

The specific reasons for Austria's opposition to Rampolla are unclear. The veto may have been based on the pro-French positions adopted by Rampolla, which were reflected in the policies of Leo XIII. Part of the Holy See's solution involving the French Republic was the attempt to reconcile French Catholics with their nation's republican government via laïcité. This was anathema to the powerful Ultramontanes. Others claimed that Austria was acting, for reasons unspecified, on behalf of Italy's government through the intervention of State Minister, or that Austria was acting on behalf of Germany.

While some prelates formally protested this intrusion after voting had been in progress, the Ultramontanist Cardinals readily recognized the existing legal right of the emperor. Support for Rampolla dissipated, leading to the election of Giuseppe Sarto as Pope Pius X. Abolition of the veto right was one of his first official acts, on 20 January 1904.

Later years

Pius X chose Rafael Merry del Val to succeed Rampolla as Secretary of State. Rampolla remained Arch-Priest of Saint Peter's. Between 1908 and his death in 1913, Rampolla served as Secretary (then the head) of the Congregation for the Doctrine of the Faith. In 1912, Pope Pius X appointed Rampolla Archivist and Librarian of the Holy Roman Church as well, a position he held until his death. He continued to be viewed as a likely successor to Pope Pius X in case of the pontiff's death.

Rampolla died suddenly in Rome on 16 December 1913 at age seventy, some months before the pope died in August 1914. He was buried in the Campo Verano Cemetery near the Basilica of San Lorenzo fuori le Mura. His friend and closest collaborator, Giacomo della Chiesa, who soon succeeded Pius X as Pope Benedict XV, presided over his funeral ceremonies. On 19 June 1929, twelve days after the Italian Parliament ratified the Lateran Treaty, the body of Cardinal Rampolla was transferred to Santa Cecilia in Trastevere.

Notes

References

Bibliography
 

 Cerami, Calogero.  La figura e l'opera del cardinale Mariano Rampolla del Tindaro (Caltanissetta: S. Sciascia, 2006)[Storia e cultura di Sicilia, 19].
 
 Frei, Peter.  Die Papstwahl des Jahres 1903, unter besonderer Berucksichtigung des osterreichisch -ungarischen Vetos (Bern/Frankfurt a. Main 1977).
 Larkin, Maurice. Church and State after the Dreyfus Affair: The Separation Issue in France (New York: Harper & Row, Springer, 1974), 40–89; 117–133.

 [Mathieu, Cardinal François Désiré]. Les derniers jours de Léon XIII et le Conclave, par un Temoin (Paris: Librarie Victor Lecoffre 1904), 98-115.
 Sinopoli di Giunta, G.  Pietro. Il Cardinale Mariano Rampolla del Tindaro (Rome: Vatican Press, 1923).

External links
 

1843 births
1913 deaths
People from Polizzi Generosa
Almo Collegio Capranica alumni
Pontifical Gregorian University alumni
Pope Benedict XV
Cardinals created by Pope Leo XIII
20th-century Italian cardinals
Italian untitled nobility
Apostolic Nuncios to Spain
19th-century Italian Roman Catholic titular archbishops
Pontifical Ecclesiastical Academy alumni
Cardinal Secretaries of State
Members of the Holy Office
19th-century Italian cardinals